This is a list of notable composers of musicals.

See also List of musicals by composer

A-B

C-D

E-F

G-H

I-J

K-L

M-N

O-P

R

S

T-Y

 
Musical theatre composers